The gentoo penguin (Pygoscelis papua) is a penguin species (or possibly a species complex) in the genus Pygoscelis, most closely related to the Adélie penguin (P. adeliae) and the chinstrap penguin (P. antarcticus). The earliest scientific description was made in 1781 by Johann Reinhold Forster with a type locality in the Falkland Islands. The species calls in a variety of ways, but the most frequently heard is a loud trumpeting, which the bird emits with its head thrown back.

Names
The application of "gentoo" to the penguin is unclear. Gentoo was an Anglo-Indian term to distinguish Hindus from Muslims. The English term may have originated from the Portuguese gentio ("pagan, gentile"). Some speculate that the white patch on the bird's head was thought to resemble a turban.

It may also be a variation of another name for this bird, "Johnny penguin", with Johnny being  in Spanish and sounds vaguely like gentoo. The Johnny rook, a predator, is likely named after the Johnny penguin.

The specific name papua is a misnomer; in the original description, Johann Reinhold Forster, a naturalist who had circumnavigated the world with Captain James Cook, mistakenly assumed that the species occurred in Papua (New Guinea), the closest gentoos being over 6000 km to the south (on Macquarie Island). No penguins are found in New Guinea. Others trace the error to a "possibly fraudulent claim" in 1776 by French naturalist Pierre Sonnerat, who also alleged a Papuan location for the king penguin despite never having been to the island himself.

Taxonomy
The gentoo penguin is one of three species in the genus Pygoscelis. Mitochondrial and nuclear DNA evidence suggests the genus split from other penguins around 38 million years ago (Mya), about 2 million years after the ancestors of the genus Aptenodytes. In turn, the Adélie penguins split off from the other members of the genus around 19 Mya and the chinstrap and gentoo finally diverged around 14 Mya.

There are 4 subspecies recognized by the International Ornithological Congress:

 P. p. taeniata (eastern gentoo penguin) (Peale, 1849) - Crozet Islands, Prince Edward Islands, Kerguelen Islands, Heard Island, and Macquarie Island
 P. p. papua (northern gentoo penguin) (Forster, 1781) - Falkland Islands, Martillo Island in the Beagle Channel, and Isla de los Estados (Argentina)
 P. p. ellsworthi (southern gentoo penguin) Murphy, 1947 - the Antarctic Peninsula, the South Orkney Islands, South Shetland Islands and South Sandwich Islands
 P. p. poncetii (South Georgia gentoo penguin) Tyler, Bonfitto, Clucas, Reddy & Younger, 2020 - South Georgia Island

Although the population on the Kerguelen Islands is tentatively included in taeniata, it may also be a distinct subspecies.

Before 2021, only two subspecies of the gentoo penguin have been recognised: P. p. papua (subantarctic gentoo) and the smaller P. p. ellsworthi (Antarctic gentoo).  However, a 2020 study suggested that the gentoo penguin be split into a species complex of four morphologically similar but separate species: the northern gentoo penguin (P. papua sensu stricto), the southern gentoo penguin (P. ellsworthi), the eastern gentoo penguin (P. taeniata) and the newly described South Georgia gentoo penguin (P. poncetii). The International Ornithological Congress incorporated the results of this study in 2021, but relegated the newly-recognized or newly-described species to being subspecies of P. papua.

Description

The gentoo penguin is easily recognised by the wide, white stripe extending like a bonnet across the top of its head and its bright orange-red bill. It has pale whitish-pink, webbed feet and a fairly long tail – the most prominent tail of all penguin species. Chicks have grey backs with white fronts. As the gentoo penguin waddles along on land, its tail sticks out behind, sweeping from side to side, hence the scientific name Pygoscelis, which means "rump-tailed".

Males have a maximum weight around  just before moulting and a minimum weight of about  just before mating. For females, the maximum weight is  just before moulting, but their weight drops to as little as  when guarding the chicks in the nest. Birds from the north are on average  heavier and  longer than the southern birds. Southern gentoo penguins reach  in length. Gentoos are well adapted to extremely cold and harsh climates.

Breeding

The breeding colonies of gentoo penguins are located on ice-free surfaces. Settlements can be located directly on the shoreline or considerably inland. They prefer shallow coastal areas and often nest between tufts of grass. In South Georgia, for example, breeding colonies are 2 km inland. In colonies farther inland, where the penguins nest in grassy areas, they shift location slightly yearly because the grass becomes trampled over time.

Gentoos breed on many subantarctic islands. The main colonies are on the Falkland Islands, South Georgia and the South Sandwich Islands and Kerguelen Islands; smaller colonies are found on: Macquarie Island, Heard Islands, Crozet Islands, South Shetland Islands and the Antarctic Peninsula. The total breeding population is estimated to be over 600,000 birds. Gentoos breed monogamously and infidelity is typically punished with banishment from the colony. The stones are jealously guarded, and their ownership can be the subject of noisy disputes and physical attacks between individuals. They are also prized by the females, even to the point that a male penguin can obtain the favours of a female by offering her a choice stone.

The parents share incubation, changing duty daily. The eggs hatch after 34 to 36 days. The chicks remain in the nests for around 30 days before joining other chicks in the colony and forming crèches. The chicks moult into subadult plumage and go out to sea at around 80 to 100 days.

Diet
Gentoos mainly live on crustaceans, such as krill and shrimp, with fish and cephalopods making up only about 15% and 10% of the diet respectively. They are, however, opportunistic feeders and around the Falklands are known to take roughly equal proportions of fish (Patagonotothen sp., Thysanopsetta naresi, Micromesistius australis), squat lobsters (Munida gregaria) and squid (Loligo gahi, Gonatus antarcticus, Moroteuthis ingens). Other prey include Lepidonotothen squamifrons, Channichthys rhinoceratus and octopuses.

Physiology
 The gentoos' diet is high in salt, as they eat organisms with relatively the same salinity as seawater, which can lead to complications associated with high sodium concentrations in the body, especially for gentoo chicks. To counteract this, gentoos, as well as many other marine bird species, have a highly developed salt gland located above their eyes that takes the high concentration of sodium within the body and produces a highly saline-concentrated solution that drips out of the body from the tip of the beak.

Gentoo penguins do not store as much fat as Adélie penguins, their closest relative; gentoos require less energy investment when hunting because the net gain of energy after hunting is greater in gentoos than Adélies. As embryos, gentoos require a lot of energy to develop.  Oxygen consumption is high for a developing gentoo embryo. As the embryo grows and requires more oxygen, consumption increases exponentially until the gentoo chick hatches. By then, the chick is consuming around 1800 ml O2 per day.

Predators

In the sea, leopard seals, sea lions and killer whales are all predators of the gentoo. On land, no predators of full-grown, healthy gentoo penguins exist. Skuas and giant petrels regularly kill many chicks and steal eggs; petrels kill injured and sick adult gentoos. Various other seabirds, such as the kelp gull and snowy sheathbill, also snatch chicks and eggs. Skuas on King George Island have been observed attacking and injuring adult gentoo penguins in apparent territorial disputes.

Conservation status
, the IUCN Red List lists the gentoo as least concerned with a stable population trend, although rapid declines in some key areas are believed to be driving a moderate overall decline in the species population. Examples include Bird Island, South Georgia, where the population has fallen by two-thirds over 25 years. Many threats to this species, including pollution, hunting, fishing and human recreational activities continue to affect them.

Influence 
The Linux distribution Gentoo Linux is named after the gentoo penguin. This is a nod to the fact that the penguin is the fastest swimming penguin, as Gentoo Linux aims to be a high-performance operating system.

Gallery

References

External links

 70South – more info on the gentoo penguin
 Gentoo penguin on PenguinWorld
 Gentoo penguins from the International Penguin Conservation website
 www.pinguins.info: information about all species of penguins
 Gentoo penguin images
 Gentoo penguin webcam from the Antarctic – worldwide first webcam with wild penguins; photo quality
 

gentoo penguin
Birds of Antarctica
Birds of islands of the Atlantic Ocean
Birds of subantarctic islands
Birds of the Indian Ocean
Birds of the Southern Ocean
Fauna of Heard Island and McDonald Islands
Fauna of the Crozet Islands
Fauna of the Prince Edward Islands
Flightless birds
Macquarie Island
gentoo penguin
gentoo penguin